Urban Dance Squad was a Dutch rap rock band formed after what was originally intended as a one-time jam-session at a festival in Utrecht on December 20, 1986.  The band consisted of a guitarist, bassist, drummer, rapper, and DJ.  Urban Dance Squad was one of the most successful Dutch bands of the nineties, releasing five studio albums.

Career 

Urban Dance Squad first got together in 1986, at a jam session in De Vrije Vloer, a club in Utrecht, a jam which resulted in the first Dutch rock band with a rapper (they borrowed the name from Parliament-Funkadelic's Urban Dancefloor Guerillas); a song, "Struggle for Jive"; and the blending of white and black music in the Netherlands, at the same time that Fishbone, Living Colour, Red Hot Chili Peppers, Faith No More, and the Beastie Boys were doing the same in the United States. The band recorded its first album, Mental Floss for the Globe, in Brussels in 1989 (produced by Jean-Marie Aerts, of TC Matic), and came to instant success. It won an Edison Award, and the single "Deeper Shade of Soul" was a hit in Europe, and in the United States, where it charted at number 21 on the Billboard Hot 100. Two more singles were released from the album, and Urban Dance Squad toured the US in 1991, opening for Living Colour--The Pittsburgh Press described their music as "refried Zeppelin riffs and neo-Hendrix guitar solos complete with sound effects and old soul records to produce an exceedingly loud, densely packed, dissonant garage-rock stew." The UDS had always been a volatile unit with the band members frequently arguing, and this came to a head while touring as the opening act for U2, after the release of Life 'n Perspectives of a Genuine Crossover, when DJ DNA quit abruptly.

In the middle of the band's career, to capitalize on the success of grunge and alternative rock, Urban Dance Squad released Persona Non Grata in January 1994. All of the tracks feature heavy use of distortion and guitar. The singles "No Honestly" and "Candy Strip Exp." were released, the latter single being released as a radio edit that cuts most of the pre-song noise.

Artantica saw release in 1999, and was a return to the band's hip-hop roots, and received critical acclaim. Urban Dance Squad disbanded the following year, though they did perform together again as late as 2006.

Music 

Urban Dance Squad's music encompassed funk, soul, heavy metal, hip hop, reggae, jazz and ska. The band's music has been classified as rap rock, rap metal, hip hop and funk metal.

Band members 

 Rudeboy Remington (Patrick Tilon) - vocals
 Tres Manos (René van Barneveld) - guitar
 Silly Sil (Silvano Matadin) - bass guitar
 Magic Stick (Michel Schoots) - drums
 DJ DNA (Arjen de Vreede) - turntables (1987-1993, 1997-2000, 2006)
 U-Gene - keyboards (1996-1997)

Discography

Albums 

 Mental Floss for the Globe (1989)
 Life 'n Perspectives of a Genuine Crossover (1991)
 Persona Non Grata (1994)
 Planet Ultra (1996)
 Beograd Live (1997)
 Artantica (1999)
 The Singles Collection (2006)

Extended plays 
 Mental Relapse (1991) – US only

Singles

Other media

Film 

 "Fast Lane" appears in the 1990 film Pump Up the Volume but does not appear on the soundtrack album.
 The song "Good Grief" appears on the soundtrack of the 1995 film Hackers, and the band has a cameo appearance in the film with the same song.
 The song "Demagogue" appears on the soundtrack of the 2001 film Crazy/Beautiful and in 2003 on Gigli.

Documentary 

 5 jaar wanorde (5 years of mayhem) is a two-part documentary about Urban Dance Squad by director Bram van Splunteren for VPRO's Onrust, originally broadcast in 1992.

References 

 Frans Steensma (ed), "OOR's Eerste Nederlandse Pop-encyclopedie" (12th edition, Amsterdam, 2000)

Dutch rock music groups
Dutch hip hop groups
Rap rock groups
Rap metal musical groups
Funk metal musical groups
Virgin Records artists
Arista Records artists
Musical groups established in 1986
1986 establishments in the Netherlands
Musical groups from Utrecht (city)